Jennifer Moxley (born 12 May 1964) is an American poet, editor, and translator (French) who was born in San Diego, California. She got her GED at 16, took college courses while working in her father's shop, spent a year as an au pair in Paris at age 18, and then attended the University of California, San Diego. Her time at the school is detailed in her memoir, The Middle Room. She currently teaches poetry and poetics at the University of Maine and resides in Orono, Maine with her partner, Steve Evans. She is working on an English translation of the poems and diaries of Quebecois poet Marie Uguay.

In 2015, Moxley's collection The Open Secret won the Poetry Society of America's William Carlos Williams Award, and her poems have been included in two anthologies of contemporary American verse published by W. W. Norton & Company.

Work

Poetry 
Imagination Verses (New York: Tender Buttons, 1996) UK Edition (Cambridge: Salt, 2003)
The Sense Record (Washington DC: Edge, 2002) UK Edition (Cambridge: Salt, 2003)
Often Capital (Chicago: Flood, 2005)
The Line (Sausalito: Post-Apollo, 2007)
Clampdown (Chicago: Flood, 2009)
Foyer States (Iowa City: Catenary, 2013)
The Open Secret (Chicago: Flood Editions, 2014)
Druthers (Chicago: Flood Editions, 2018)

Prose 
 For the Good of All, Do Not Destroy the Birds: Essays (Chicago: Flood Editions, 2021)
 There Are Things We Live Among: Essays on the Object World. (Chicago: Flood Editions, 2012)
 The Middle Room (Berkeley, CA: subpress, 2007)

Editing 
The Poker (Somerville, MA), contributing editor, 2003 to present
The Baffler (Chicago), poetry editor, 1997.
The Impercipient Lecture Series (Providence), co-editor with Steve Evans, 1997
The Impercipient (Providence), founder and editor 1992 to 1995

Translation 
Writing the Real: A Bilingual Anthology of Contemporary French Poetry (translated Anne Portugal), 2016. Enitharmon Press
The Translation Begins by Jacqueline Risset (Providence: Burning Deck, 1996)
Sleep's Powers by Jacqueline Risset (New York: Ugly Duckling Presse)

References

Jennifer Moxley at EPC
Jennifer Moxley at PennSound

External links
Ron Silliman reviews The Line  poet Ron Silliman from his own weblog, July 2007. Previously, Silliman discussed Moxley's Often Capital (and her poetry in general), on his blog during June 2005 (link here) and (here)
Jennifer Moxley's Website

1964 births
Living people
American women poets
21st-century American poets
21st-century American translators
21st-century American women writers